This is a list of Croatian television related events from 1998.

Events
6 March - Danijela Martinović is selected to represent Croatia at the 1998 Eurovision Song Contest with her song "Neka mi ne svane". She is selected to be the sixth Croatian Eurovision entry during Dora held at the Crystal Ballroom of Hotel Kvarner in Opatija.

Debuts

Television shows

Ending this year

Births

Deaths